In 2018, 10.2% of people of Argentina had various degree of disability. There are also 28.7% households who have at least one member having disability.

History
On 16 March 1981, the country passed and enacted Law 22.431 which gives benefits to people with disabilities on job and professional trainings, loans, subsidies, education support and state benefits. In 1997, Law 24.901 was passed and enacted which established a system of basic welfare and care for people with disabilities. In 2001, Law 25.504 was passed and enacted which allowed the Ministry of Health to award certificate of disability.

See also
 Demographics of Argentina

References